Ab Barik-e Sofla (also Romanized as Āb Bārīk-e Soflá and Āb Bārīk Soflá; also known as Āb Bārīk-e Pā’īn and Āb Bārīk Pā’īn) is a village in Borborud-e Sharqi Rural District, in the Central District of Aligudarz County, Lorestan Province, Iran. At the 2006 census, its population was 360, in 69 families.

References 

Towns and villages in Aligudarz County